FC Spartak Trnava is a Slovak professional football club based in Trnava. Historically, it is one of the most successful clubs in the country, having won the Czechoslovak First League five times and the Czechoslovak Cup on four occasions, and reaching the semi-final of the European Cup once and the quarter-final twice. More recently, the club won the Slovak league title in 2018, as well as Slovak cup in 2019 and 2022.

History
The club was founded on 30 May 1923 by the merger of Šk Čechie and ČšŠk into TSS Trnava. After a communist takeover it became affiliated with the metal industry and was renamed to TJ Kovosmalt ("Metal-enamel").

Previous names
 ŠK Rapid Trnava (1923–39)
 TSS Trnava (1939–48)
 Sokol NV Trnava (1948–49)
 ZTJ Kovosmalt Trnava (1949–53)
 Spartak Trnava (1953–67)
 Spartak TAZ Trnava (1967–88)
 Spartak ZTS Trnava (1988–93)
 FC Spartak Trnava (1993–)

Golden era
In 1952, the club gained its current name, but the performance in those years was very unstable, Spartak played the 2nd league and after advancing to the highest competition, they occupied mostly the lower parts of the table. A better position came only in the 1959/60 season, when Spartak took 4th place. The Golden era of Spartak began in the 1966–67 season. The team of legendary coach Anton Malatinský was top of the league by the autumn, but by the end of the season had finished only in third place. Great success was achieved in the Mitropa Cup. Spartak beat teams like Budapest Honvéd, Lazio and Fiorentina and in the final they defeated Újpest of Hungary. In the following season Spartak gained their most memorable European results. They reached the semi-final of the European Cup to face Ajax. It is their greatest success to date.

Ajax won 3–2 on aggregate.

Under the management of Ján Hucko, the team also won a second championship. In 1970–71 and 1971–72, Trnava won their third and fourth championship titles under coaches Valér Švec and Anton Malatinský. The team also reached the quarter-final of the European Cup in 1973 and 1974. The fifth and the last league title in 1972–73 beckoned the end of Spartak's golden era.  In 1976, Karol Dobiaš was in the squad that won the UEFA Euro 1976.

1990s
Although Spartak finished 16th (and last) in the last unified Czechoslovak league season in 1992–93, the latter half of the 1990s can be considered the renaissance of football in Trnava. During the 1995–96 season, Spartak finished third and its popularity grew. The 1996–97 season was a memorable one for the fans of Spartak, Karol Pecze almost led the team to its first Slovakian league title but got beaten to it by Košice in the final week of competition. The following season, under new coach Dušan Galis the team again achieved second place and then third place during the 1998–99 season which saw the end of this recovery of footballing prowess in Trnava.

2018–19
In Fortuna liga season 2017–18 Spartak won the league title for the first time in 45 years. Under the leadership of coach Nestor El Maestro, Trnava won the title three games before the end of the 2017–18 season after a 2–0 victory over Dunajská Streda. The title celebrations took place after the last season match against AS Trenčín (17,113 spectators). They included an autograph session, a ride on the city on an open bus, fireworks and a solemn Holy Mass in the Cathedral sv. Jána Krstiteľa. These were the biggest title celebrations in the history of Slovakia. During the 2018–19 season Spartak reached the UEFA Europa League group stage for the first time. They played against GNK Dinamo Zagreb, Fenerbahçe and R.S.C. Anderlecht. They finished 3rd with a record of 2 wins, 1 draw and 3 losses.

Despite an abysmal league campaign, Spartak managed to win the 2018–19 Slovak Cup.

Honours

Domestic
 Czechoslovakia
 Czechoslovak First League (1945–1993)
  Winners (5): 1967–68, 1968–69, 1970–71, 1971–72, 1972–73
  Runners-up (1): 1969–70
  Third place (1): 1966–67
 Czechoslovak Cup 
  Winners (4): 1967, 1971, 1975, 1986

 Slovakia
 Slovak Super Liga (1993–present)
  Winners (1): 2017–18
  Runners-up (3):1996–97, 1997–98, 2011–12
  Third place (6): 1995–96, 1998–99, 2005–06, 2008–09, 2013–14, 2020–21
 Slovak Cup 
  Winners (7): 1970–71, 1974–75, 1985–86, 1990–91, 1997–98, 2018–19, 2021–22
 Slovak Super Cup (1993–2014)
  Winners (1): 1998

Top goalscorers
The Czechoslovak League top scorer from 1944 to 1945 until 1992–93. Since the 1993–94 Slovak League Top scorer.

1Shared award

European
 European Cup (UEFA Champions League)
 Semi-final (1): 1968–69
 Quarter-final (2): 1972–73, 1973–74
 Mitropa Cup
  Winners (1): 1966–67
  Runner-up (2): 1958, 1967–68

UEFA ranking
This is the current UEFA coefficient ranking as of 31 July 2022:

Full list

Affiliated clubs
The following clubs are currently affiliated with Spartak Trnava:
  Lokomotíva Trnava (2016–present)
  PFK Piešťany (2020–present)

Sponsorship

Support and tradition

The main ultras group is called Ultras Spartak. Traditionally, the club has had great support in the city, but it is very popular in the whole region.

The club's official anthem is Il Silenzio. It is played prior to every home match, when the players are entering onto the pitch.

Between 1988 and 2006, Spartak ultras had a mutual friendship with Baník Ostrava fans. Good relations and friendship still persist to this day.

Rivalries

The greatest rival is Slovan Bratislava. The rivalry has a long tradition and the derby is considered the most prestigious match in the Slovak football calendar.

Stadium
Anton Malatinský Stadium is located in the centre of Trnava, directly behind the walls of the old town. Formerly known simply as Spartak stadium, it was renamed in 1998 in honour of the club's most successful manager Anton Malatinský.

Stadium underwent a complex reconstruction in 2013–2015. Opening ceremony of the new stadium took place on 22 August 2015. The stadium has capacity of 19,200 spectators.

Transfers
Spartak have produced numerous players who have gone on to represent the Slovak national football team. Over the last period there has been a steady increase of young players leaving Spartak after a few years of first team football and moving on to play football in leagues of a higher standard, with the Austrian Football Bundesliga (Július Šimon to FK Austria Wien in 1997, season 1997–98 topscorer Ľubomír Luhový to Grazer AK in 1998), Greece Superleague (Erik Sabo to PAOK in 2015, Peter Doležaj to Olympiacos Volos in 2011), French Ligue 1 (Koro Koné to Dijon FCO in 2012, Adam Jakubech to Lille OSC in 2017), Czech First League (Vladimír Leitner to FK Teplice in 2000, Kamil Susko to FC Baník Ostrava in 2000), Cypriot First Division (Dušan Tittel to AC Omonia in 1999), Norway Tippeligaen (Martin Husár to Lillestrøm SK in 2006), Polish Ekstraklasa (Erik Jendrišek to Crakovia in 2015, Ján Vlasko to Zagłębie Lubin in 2015, Dobrivoj Rusov to Piast Gliwice in 2014, and Ľuboš Kamenár to Śląsk Wrocław in 2016. The top transfer was agreed in 1999 when Miroslav Karhan joined Spanish Real Betis for a fee €2.3 million.

Record transfers

*-unofficial fee

Players

Current squad

For recent transfers, see List of Slovak football transfers winter 2022-23.

On loan

Retired numbers

Current technical staff

Club officials

Records

League history
 Czechoslovak First League (1948–93)

 Slovak Super Liga (1993–present)

European competitions

Accurate as of 11 August 2022

Notable players
Had international caps for their respective countries. Players whose name is listed with a bold represented their countries while playing for Spartak.
Past (and present) players who are the subjects of Wikipedia articles can be found here.

Player records

Most appearances

Most goals

Manager history

References

External links
Official website 
Spartak Trnava statistics

 
Trnava, Spartak
Spartak
Association football clubs established in 1923
Trnava, Spartak
1923 establishments in Slovakia
Trnava, Spartak